Escallonia is a genus of shrubs and trees in the family Escalloniaceae. They are native to North and South America.

Taxonomy
Currently valid species in Escallonia are:

 Escallonia alpina
 Escallonia angustifolia 
 Escallonia bifida
 Escallonia callcottiae
 Escallonia chlorophylla
 Escallonia cordobensis
 Escallonia discolor 
 Escallonia farinacea 
 Escallonia florida  
 Escallonia gayana  
 Escallonia herrerae 
 Escallonia hispida
 Escallonia hypoglauca
 Escallonia illinita
 Escallonia laevis
 Escallonia ledifolia
 Escallonia leucantha
 Escallonia megapotamica
 Escallonia micrantha
 Escallonia millegrana   
 Escallonia myrtilloides 
 Escallonia myrtoidea  
 Escallonia obtusissima
 Escallonia paniculata
 Escallonia pendula 
 Escallonia petrophila
 Escallonia piurensis
 Escallonia polifolia 
 Escallonia pulverulenta    
 Escallonia resinosa
 Escallonia reticulata 
 Escallonia revoluta 
 Escallonia rosea  
 Escallonia rubra
 Escallonia salicifolia
 Escallonia schreiteri
 Escallonia serrata
 Escallonia tucumanensis
 Escallonia virgata

Cultivation
Flowering from June to October (in the Northern Hemisphere), they have masses of small pink, white or crimson flowers, sometimes with a honey fragrance. They are best grown in full sun with some shelter. Some varieties are not fully hardy in all areas. Numerous cultivars and hybrids have been developed, of which the following have gained the Royal Horticultural Society's Award of Garden Merit: 

'Apple Blossom' (pink)
'Donard Radiance' (rose red)
'Iveyi' (white)
' Langleyensis' (rose pink)
'Peach Blossom' (pink)
'Pride of Donard' (rose red)
Escallonia bifida (white)
Escallonia rubra 'Crimson Spire' (crimson)

Gallery

References

 
Asterid genera
Shrubs
Garden plants of South America